William Magambo was an Anglican bishop in Uganda: he was Bishop of West Ankole from 1997 to 2005.

References

21st-century Anglican bishops in Uganda
Anglican bishops of West Ankole